Nuno Henrique Pina Nunes (born 31 March 1999) is a Portuguese professional footballer, who plays for Torreense.

Club career
Pina joined the under-19 squad of the Italian club Chievo in the early 2019. He made his professional Serie B debut for Chievo on 21 September 2019 in a game against Pisa, replacing Joel Obi in the 89th minute. He made his first starting lineup appearance on 25 September 2019 against Salernitana and was sent off for two cautions in the 77th minute.

On 31 January 2020, Pina was loaned to Belenenses SAD until 30 June 2021. On 27 August 2020 he moved to Switzerland on loan to Grasshoppers.

On 16 August 2021, Pina switched teams and countries again, after signing a three-year contract with Spanish Segunda División team CF Fuenlabrada. The following 28 January, after being rarely used, he terminated his link.

International career
Born in Portugal, Pina is of Cape Verdean descent. He played in 2 games (including the full game in the finals against Italy) at the 2018 UEFA European Under-19 Championship, which Portugal won.

He was included in Portugal's squad for the 2019 FIFA U-20 World Cup and made one appearance as a substitute as Portugal was eliminated in group stage.

References

External links
 
 
 

1999 births
Living people
Footballers from Lisbon
Portuguese footballers
Portuguese expatriate footballers
Portugal youth international footballers
Portuguese people of Cape Verdean descent
Association football midfielders
A.C. ChievoVerona players
Belenenses SAD players
Grasshopper Club Zürich players
CF Fuenlabrada footballers
Primeira Liga players
Serie B players
Swiss Challenge League players
Segunda División players
Portuguese expatriate sportspeople in Italy
Portuguese expatriate sportspeople in Switzerland
Portuguese expatriate sportspeople in Spain
Expatriate footballers in Italy
Expatriate footballers in Switzerland
Expatriate footballers in Spain